Excalibur  is a steel roller coaster with a wooden structure located at Valleyfair in Shakopee, Minnesota. It was built in 1989 by Arrow Dynamics, for the cost of $3,000,000. The ride is 105 feet (32 m) tall with a top speed of 54.5 mph (87.7 km/h) and has a minimum height requirement of 48 inches. It follows a customized figure-eight track layout and is rather short for a major roller coaster, with a total ride duration of two minutes and thirteen seconds.

A few years after the ride was built, trim brakes were added at the top of the first hill. The bottom and first half of the turn were re-profiled in an attempt to reduce roughness. The photo spot and the "Excalibur Photos" booth were also removed. The photo booth was replaced with a Refreshment stand, which has also been removed.

Potential closure
Valleyfair has applied for a permit with the US Army Corps of Engineers that includes the removal of Excalibur to be replaced by a road and parking lot.

"APPLICATION FOR PERMIT TO discharge dredged and fill material into 4.52 acres of wetland for the purpose of constructing a new road around the park for employee access and for the construction of a new parking lot. The Valleyfair expansion project includes a proposed road relocation that will be used by park guests and primarily park employees to access nonpublic areas of the park and two parking areas, one for guests and one for staff."

References

External links

Official page

Roller coasters introduced in 1989
Roller coasters operated by Cedar Fair
Roller coasters in Minnesota
Hybrid roller coasters
Valleyfair